Single combat is a duel between two single warriors which takes place in the context of a battle between two armies.

Instances of single combat are known from Classical Antiquity and the Middle Ages. The champions were often combatants who represented larger, spectator groups. Such representative contests and stories thereof are known worldwide.

Typically, it takes place in the no-man's-land between the opposing armies, with other warriors watching and themselves refraining from fighting until one of the two single combatants has won. Often, it is champion warfare, with the two considered the champions of their respective sides.

Single combat could also take place within a larger battle. Neither ancient nor medieval warfare always relied on the line or phalanx formation. The Iliad notably describes the battles of the Trojan war as a series of single encounters on the field, and the medieval code of chivalry, partly inspired by this, encouraged the single combat between individual knights on the battlefield, in which the loser was not usually killed but taken captive for ransom. However, the use of the longbow and the pike square against mounted knights (as at the battles of Crécy and Laupen) ended this tradition in the 14th century, although it was continued away from the battlefield, with the pas d'armes and the early modern duel.

Antiquity
An important episode in "The Tale of Sinuhe", one of the most well-known works of Ancient Egyptian literature, concerns the protagonist – an Egyptian exile in Upper Retjenu (Canaan) – defeating a powerful opponent in single combat.

Duels between individual warriors are depicted in the Iliad, including those between Menelaus and Paris and later between Achilles and Hector. The Hebrew Bible also includes a few accounts of single combat, the most famous being David versus Goliath.

Single combat is mentioned quite frequently in the history of ancient Rome – Romulus defeated Acro, king of Caenina for the spolia opima; the Horatii's defeat of the Alba Longan Curiatii in the 7th century BC is reported by Livy to have settled a war in Rome's favor and subjected Alba Longa to Rome; Aulus Cornelius Cossus defeated Lars Tolumnius, king of the Veientes in single combat and took the spolia opima. In the 3rd century BC; Marcus Claudius Marcellus took the spolia opima from Viridomarus, king of the Gaesatae, at the Battle of Clastidium (222 BC); and Marcus Licinius Crassus from Deldo, king of the Bastarnae (29 BC).

Depictions of single combat also appear in the Hindu epics of the Mahābhārata and the Ramayana. Single combats are often preludes to battles in the Chinese epic Romance of the Three Kingdoms and are featured prominently throughout the epic.

Middle Ages
In The Cattle Raid of Cooley, a famous episode of Irish mythology, all the warriors of Ulster but Cúchulainn are made sick by a curse and unable to fight the invading army of Queen Maeb, leaving Cúchulainn to fight a whole series of single combats by himself until they recover. The Welsh mythological tale, the Fourth Branch of the Mabinogi, depicts a single combat between the southern prince Pryderi and the northern magician Gwydion, to determine the victor of a war between the two kingdoms.

Many battles depicted in the medieval Chanson de Roland consist of a series of single combats, as are battles in the early Russian epic poem The Tale of Igor's Campaign (the basis of Borodin's Opera Prince Igor) and the battles depicted in various tales of the Arabian Nights. 

Guy of Warwick, the legendary English Romance hero, is depicted as defeating in single combat the Viking giant Colbrand; the story is set in the time of Athelstan of England, but actually reflects the society of the late Middle Ages.

An important episode in Geoffrey of Monmouth's legendary History of the Kings of Britain  is the single combat between prince Nennius of Britain and Julius Caesar.

Single combat was also a prelude to battles in pre-Islamic Arabia and early Islamic battles. For example, the Battle of Badr, one of the most important in the early history of Islam, was opened by three champions of the Islamic side (Ali, Ubaydah, and Hamzah) stepping forward, engaging and defeating three of the then-Pagan Meccans, although Ubaydah was mortally wounded. This result of the three single combats was considered to have substantially contributed to the Muslim victory in the overall battle which followed. Duels were also part of other battles at the time of Muhammad, such as the battle of Uhud, battle of the Trench and the battle of Khaybar.
In the early Muslim conquest the Muslim commander would often duel with the enemy commander, For example, Khalid ibn al-Walid and hormozd in the battle of the chains.

Single combats were characteristic of the Samurai fighting tradition and known as Ikki-uchi. As each samurai commanded his unit of retainers, successfully challenging and defeating the opposing samurai by a single combat can force the entire unit to retreat minimizing casualties and changing the course of battle. Those seeking a suitable opponent, frequently used Nanori to issue a challenge by announcing his name and bravery as well as ridiculing opponents to boost morale of his side as well as enrage the opponent to force the combat. As this is a high-risk-low-return strategy for the winning side, already defeated side, or ill-matched opponent (difference of personal standing or martial reputation) it was acceptable to decline or elude the single combat. An example of single-combat with the tragic result for the victor is told in Heike Monogatari as Kumagai Naozane defeated Taira no Atsumori at the Battle of Ichi-no-Tani. It could be banned by the overall commander as needed and notably during Mongol invasions of Japan, particularly during the second invasion in 1281, samurai fought as massed mounted archer/warrior with the annihilation of enemy as the goal. This tradition declines and disappears during the Sengoku period as each side prepared trained armies in thousands or even tens of thousands making the single combat have a limited, if any, effect on the outcome of the battle.

In Russia, single combat is known as  bash na bash (an old Russian expression meaning "one-on-one"), substituting a fight between champions for a full-scale battle was a traditional way to avoid the bloodshed of an internecine war. The leaders of the opposing druzhinas or other armed groups either rode towards the centre of the battlefield or sent messengers to negotiate whether the two most skilled fighters or the leaders themselves would engage in single combat, usually to the death. The outcome of the champions' fight would then be taken as a sign of which side the higher powers favoured, and could have political consequences similar to the result of a full battle.

The oldest written account of such a fight is found in Nestor's Primary Chronicle; it describes a duel between a Kievan champion and the Pechenegs' best fighter. The most well-known fight, however, was that between Prince Mstislav the Brave of Tmutarakan and the Kasog Prince Rededia in 1022, in which Mstislav defeated Rededia and killed him with a dagger. According to the Primary Chronicle, Mstislav's victory allowed him to take tribute from the Kasogs and to have a church built; he also took Rededia's wife and two sons and had them baptised into Christianity, upon which he had his daughter married to Rededia's son according to the tradition of the times. Although Rededia had been killed, he was honoured by Mstislav, and his family joined the ranks of the Russian nobility.

The semi-legendary Tale of the Destruction of Riazan includes an extensive account of the  combat between the Russian hero Evpaty Kolovrat and the Tatar warrior Hostovrul. Kolovrat splits his opponent in half with his sword and wins the duel. However, Kolovrat is then attacked and killed from a distance by Tatar stone throwers. The Mongol ruler Batu Khan, impressed with his bravery, honours his body.

Sometimes however, such single combat would merely initiate a battle rather than prevent it. The most famous example of this was the duel between Russian monk Alexander Peresvet and the Golden Horde champion Chelubey or Temir-Murza at the beginning of the Battle of Kulikovo in 1380. The champions killed each other in the first run, though according to Russian legend, Peresvet did not fall from the saddle, while Temir-murza did.

In Kerala, India, duelling between warriors was used to settle conflicts between local rulers.
The prime martial caste of Kerala, Nairs, and some prominent Ezhava families made up the Chekavars (which literally means "those who are prepared to die" in the   Malayalam language). Some prominent warriors who took part in such ankam (duels) were Thacholi Othenan, Unniarcha, Aromal Chekavar, whose legends are described in the Vadukkan Pattukal (Northern Ballads). The Mamankam Festival held by the Zamorin ruler in the kingdom of modern-day Kozhikode, was a ritual which glorified the martial traditions of warrior families in the Malabar. The ritual ended after the Zamorin was overthrown. The Kerala practice was discontinued in the 19th century under the British Raj.

In personal combat, fought on the backs of war elephants, during a war between Burma and Siam, Siamese King Naresuan slew Burmese Crown Prince Mingyi Swa in 1593.

Modern examples

Captain John Smith of Jamestown is reputed in his earlier career as a mercenary in Eastern Europe to have defeated, killed and beheaded Turkish commanders in three single combats, for which he was knighted by the Transylvanian Prince Sigismund Báthory and given a horse and coat of Arms showing three Turks' heads.

Dramatist Ben Jonson, in conversations with the poet William Drummond, recounted that when serving in the Low Countries as a volunteer with the regiments of Francis Vere, he had defeated an opponent in single combat "in view of both armies" and stripped him of his weapons.

In more recent times, single combats have become iconic – though often apocryphal – elements of aerial dogfights, with the idea, if not the practice, of single combat in the skies particularly prevalent during the First World War with the air forces' emphasis on a sort of individualism and chivalry. Manfred von Richthofen, the infamous "Red Baron", is recorded as writing "If I am alone with an opponent ... only a jammed gun or an engine problem can prevent me from shooting him down."

Science fiction

Science fiction writer Fredric Brown wrote the story "Arena" in which a human space fleet prepares for battle with an invading alien fleet when a superior "elder race" intervenes, plucking a single human and a single malevolent alien to engage in single combat as the champions of their respective species.

See also
Duel
Hand-to-hand combat
History of fencing
Mard o-mard
Wager of battle

References

External links

Champions and Tradition: Single Combat in the Late Roman World

Interpersonal conflict
Combat